Gopal Datt is an Indian actor and writer. Gopal Datt started as theater artist in 1999 until he got first starring role in Mujhe Kucch Kehna Hai. He also went on to star in the blockbuster Tere Naam, Samrat & Co. and the National Award-winning Filmistaan.

Early life 
Gopal Datt was born in Nainital and finished high School in Nainital. He graduated with B.Sc. (Chemistry).  After his graduation, Gopal enrolled into the NSD (National School of Drama, Delhi) passing out in 1999.  He acted in many stage dramas like Shakespearean Italian to Parsi. His favorite theater director is B.V. Karanth.

Career 
After finishing acting course, Gopal Dutt moved to Mumbai from Delhi.  He got first break in Mujhe Kucch Kehna Hai (2001). After that he played roles in Tere Naam, in Kaushik Ghatak's 2014 Samrat & Co. as Chakradhar Pandey and also soundtrack writer in this and he played Jawaad's character in national award-winning film Filmistaan. He also became a jury in a film festival. Gopal has worked in many web series and he has been actively involved with the TVF since a very long time. He played a major role in Arre’s Official Chukyagiri and Voot’s Badman. He is known for his comedy roles in AIB videos.

Filmography

Films

Television

References

External links 
 

Indian male stage actors
Living people
Year of birth missing (living people)